Rapisardi is a surname. Notable people with the surname include:

Mario Rapisardi (1844–1912), Italian poet
Michele Rapisardi (1822–1886), Italian painter

Italian-language surnames